The second season of the American fantasy television series The Lord of the Rings: The Rings of Power is based on the novel The Lord of the Rings and its appendices by J. R. R. Tolkien. Set in the Second Age of Middle-earth, thousands of years before Tolkien's The Hobbit and The Lord of the Rings, it depicts some of the major events of the Second Age. The season is produced by Amazon Studios in association with New Line Cinema and in consultation with the Tolkien Estate. J. D. Payne and Patrick McKay serve as showrunners.

Amazon bought the television rights to The Lord of the Rings in November 2017 and made a multi-season commitment for a new series. A second season was officially ordered in November 2019, and writing began during an extended first season production break that started due to the COVID-19 pandemic. Amazon announced in August 2021 that filming for the series would move from New Zealand to the United Kingdom starting with the second season. Filming began in October 2022, with Charlotte Brändström, Sanaa Hamri, and Louise Hooper directing. Much of the series' large international cast returned from the first season. Composer Bear McCreary also returned and started work when filming began.

The eight-episode season is expected to premiere in 2024 on the streaming service Amazon Prime Video.

Cast and characters 

The following cast members have been confirmed to return from the first season:

The following new cast members have been announced for the second season:

Production

Development 
Amazon acquired the global television rights for J. R. R. Tolkien's The Lord of the Rings in November 2017. The company's streaming service, Amazon Prime Video, gave a multi-season commitment to a series based on the novel and its appendices that was believed to be for five seasons, to be produced by Amazon Studios in association with New Line Cinema and in consultation with the Tolkien Estate. J. D. Payne and Patrick McKay were hired to develop the series in July 2018, and were named showrunners a year later. Prime Video officially ordered an eight-episode second season in November 2019, and announced the series' full title, The Lord of the Rings: The Rings of Power, in January 2022. The season's all-female directing team was revealed that December: Charlotte Brändström returned from the first season to direct four episodes, while Sanaa Hamri and Louise Hooper were set to direct two episodes each. Brändström was also made a co-executive producer for the season, which was executive produced by Payne, McKay, Lindsey Weber, Callum Greene, Justin Doble, Jason Cahill, and Gennifer Hutchison.

Writing 
The series' writers room was disbanded once production on the first season began in February 2020, but a longer-than-usual four- or five-month production break was planned following the filming of the first two episodes to allow the writers to reconvene, review the early footage, map out the second season, and write the majority of its scripts. This production break ultimately began earlier than expected due to the COVID-19 pandemic, taking place from mid-March to the end of September. Writing for the second season was expected to be completed concurrently with post-production on the first season between August 2021 and June 2022.

After avoiding a "villain-centric" story in the first season to focus on introducing the world and characters, the showrunners said the second season would go deeper into the "lore and the stories people have been waiting to hear", including by featuring the Dark Lord Sauron more prominently following the reveal at the end of the first season that he was posing as the human Halbrand. McKay felt this would be more impactful because of the time Halbrand spent with Galadriel and the other characters in the first season compared to if they just started the series with Sauron as a prominent antagonist. He added that after Galadriel learned of Sauron's deception and sacrificed her brother's dagger to create the Elven Rings of Power in the first season, the next step of her journey was to explore the consequences of her actions while she was hunting for Sauron. The season depicts the Harfoot Nori and the Stranger, a Wizard, traveling to the land of Rhûn in the East of Middle-earth. This is one of the locations that had not been depicted onscreen before that the showrunners wanted to explore in the series. The season also introduces more locations and characters from Tolkien's writings, and features a "massive" two-episode battle.

Location 
Head of Amazon Studios Jennifer Salke said in June 2018 that the series could be produced in New Zealand, where the Lord of the Rings and Hobbit film trilogies were made, but Amazon was also willing to shoot in other countries as long as they could "provide those locations in a really authentic way, because we want it to look incredible". Amazon confirmed in September 2019 that filming for the first season would take place in New Zealand. Scotland was also considered as a location. Production for the first season ended on August 2, 2021, at which point the New Zealand crew were unsure when filming for the second second would begin. When ordering the second season in November 2019, Amazon considered filming it back-to-back with the first, as was done for each of the film trilogies, but there was now expected to be a hiatus of at least one year to allow post-production on the first season and writing for the second to be completed. Amazon retained its lease on Auckland film studios for the duration of the hiatus so the series' sets could remain where they had been built.

The week after filming wrapped for the first season, Amazon announced that it was moving production of the series to the United Kingdom starting with the second season. Amazon was in the process of booking studio space in the UK, and Scotland was reported to be the frontrunner for new shooting locations. The company planned to ship all of the sets that were built for the first season from New Zealand to the UK, and hire a new UK-based crew since the majority of the first season's crew was New Zealand-based. Factors that played a role in the change included Amazon already heavily investing in UK studio space for several other productions; a belief that the UK would be a "more economical choice" following the high cost of producing the first season in New Zealand; the opportunity to film in other European countries near the UK as was done for the fantasy series Game of Thrones; the Tolkien Estate wanting the series to be filmed in the UK since Tolkien was inspired by locations there for his books; and the fact that New Zealand's restrictive pandemic-era border policies had prevented Amazon executives from visiting and monitoring the production, while many international cast members (more than half of whom are British) were unable to leave the country for nearly two years during filming of the first season. Amazon had offered in August 2020 to pay for the use of hotels and rental properties as private quarantine facilities to give the production more flexibility with travel, but this idea was rejected by the New Zealand government due to the supposed need for "additional services" related to quarantining. In the UK, 80 percent of expenditure is eligible for a 25 percent tax rebate through the government's "high-end television" tax relief program.

The cast and crew expressed regret that they were not returning to New Zealand for the second season. Weber called it a "hard departure" and said they would not have been able to make the first season without the New Zealand crew, many having worked on the films as well. However, McKay felt that because Tolkien was inspired by the UK for his writings they would be "bring[ing] the property home" with the second season which would be an "opportunity... pregnant with possibilities". He also suggested that future seasons would be visiting new lands within Tolkien's world that would justify having new filming locations. Vernon Sanders, Amazon's Head of Global TV, confirmed that the second season would be "going to new lands, and there are new expansive things happening" that would take advantage of the new locations available in the UK and across Europe.

Casting 
While promoting the first season at San Diego Comic-Con in July 2022, the showrunners said they would give a role in the second season to television host and avid Tolkien fan Stephen Colbert, who was moderating the series' panel at the convention. A month later, they said the character Círdan would be introduced in the second season. The character briefly appeared in the Lord of the Rings films portrayed by Michael Elsworth.

Returning from the first season were Cynthia Addai-Robinson as Míriel, Robert Aramayo as Elrond, Owain Arthur as Durin IV, Maxim Baldry as Isildur, Nazanin Boniadi as Bronwyn, Morfydd Clark as Galadriel, Ismael Cruz Córdova as Arondir, Charles Edwards as Celebrimbor, Trystan Gravelle as Pharazôn, Ema Horvath as Eärien, Markella Kavenagh as Elanor "Nori" Brandyfoot, Geoff Morrell as Waldreg, Tyroe Muhafidin as Theo, Peter Mullan as Durin III, Sophia Nomvete as Disa, Lloyd Owen as Elendil, Alex Tarrant as Valandil, Charlie Vickers as Sauron, Benjamin Walker as Gil-galad, and Daniel Weyman as the stranger.

On December 1, Sam Hazeldine was revealed to have replaced Joseph Mawle in the role of Adar for the second season. The decision had been made several months earlier and Mawle did not participate in promotion for the first season. Amazon also announced the casting of Gabriel Akuwudike, Yasen "Zates" Atour, Ben Daniels, Amelia Kenworthy, Nia Towle, and Nicholas Woodeson. On December 7, Amazon further announced the casting of Oliver Alvin-Wilson, Stuart Bowman, Gavi Singh Chera, William Chubb, Kevin Eldon, Will Keen, Selina Lo, and Calam Lynch. Sanders noted the diversity of the season's new cast members, stating "The series continues to be cast from all around the world. We think that represents the show that we created in season one, and we're doing the same thing for season two, we are trying to find the best actor for the role."

Design 
Danish production designer Kristian Milsted joined the series for the second season. Brändström felt he had brought Scandinavian influences into the series' sets and locations.

Filming 
Pre-production was expected to begin in the second quarter of 2022, and the production was set to be primarily based at Bray Film Studios and Bovingdon Airfield outside of London. The showrunners were scouting for additional filming locations in June 2022, and the cast was preparing to travel to the UK in August. Filming began on October 3, and was set to continue for around eight months. Brändström, Hamri, and Hooper were directing their episodes simultaneously based on the availability of locations and sets. By late October, filming was taking place on Hankley Common in Surrey. A set for a ruined village was built on the reserve's "barren black landscape" (resulting from two wildfires earlier in 2022), leading to speculation that it was being used to portray Mordor. In early February, filming took place in a forest at Buttersteep Rise, by the town of Ascot in Berkshire. Prince William and Kate Middleton, who live at the nearby Windsor Castle, visited the series' set with their children.

Music 

Composer Bear McCreary received scripts for the season the day after he completed work on the first season's music. He began composing music for the second season by November 2022, including some that was needed during filming, and expressed excitement at being involved in the season from the beginning and being able to pace out his work better than on the first season.

Release 
The eight-episode season is set to be released on the streaming service Prime Video. In October 2022, the showrunners said they would be working on the season for "another couple years", and that December Sanders said the season would likely not be ready for release in 2023. The Hollywood Reporter said the series would be ready within 24 months and likely released during 2024.

References

External links 
 
 
 

Upcoming television seasons
The Lord of the Rings: The Rings of Power